The 1976 FIBA Europe Under-18 Championship was an international basketball  competition held in Santiago de Compostela, Spain in 1976.

Final standings

Team roster
Mile Stanković, Aleksandar Petrović, Pero Vučica, Predrag Bogosavljev, Damir Pavličević, Stevo Vukasović, Branko Sikirić, Željko Pribanović, Mladen Ostojić, Čedo Brborić, Miodrag Marić, and Rade Vukosavljević.

Head coach: Luka Stančić.

External links
FIBA Archive

Youth
Youth
1976
FIBA U18 European Championship